Sari van Veenendaal (born 3 April 1990) is a Dutch former professional footballer who last played as a goalkeeper for PSV and captained the Netherlands national team. She was part of the Netherlands squad that won UEFA Women's Euro 2017.

Club career

The Netherlands
Born in Nieuwegein, the Netherlands, Van Veenendaal firstly played as a professional footballer in 2007 for FC Utrecht, as an understudy to Angela Christ. In 2010, she moved to FC Twente. Whilst featuring for the Tukkers, Van Veenendaal won the Eredivisie of the 2010–11 season. She was also successful in picking up the BeNe League titles of 2013, 2014 and 2015 in all.

Arsenal
Van Veenendaal signed for the English club Arsenal in 2015. In her first season there, Arsenal won the 2015 FA WSL Cup. Next season, Arsenal won the 2016 FA Women's Cup with the club beating Chelsea 1–0 in the final. Another FA WSL cup was conquered in the 2017–18 season, when the club defeated Manchester City Women in the final and Van Veenendaal posted a clean sheet.

Atlético Madrid
In July 2019, Van Veenendaal left Arsenal upon the expiry of her contract and joined Atlético Madrid.

PSV
In May 2020, Van Veenendaal joined PSV on a free transfer. In July 2022, Van Veenendaal announced her immediate retirement.

International career
Van Veenendaal won her first cap for the senior national team on 7 March 2011, a 6–0 win over Switzerland at the Cyprus Cup.

She was called up to be part of the national team for the UEFA Women's Euro 2013 and the FIFA Women's World Cup 2015.

Van Veenendaal was part of the national team for the UEFA Women's Euro 2017. The Netherlands won the tournament. Van Veenendaal started in all six matches in the competition, and allowed just three goals, helping them to win each of the Netherlands' matches. She was named to the Best XI of the tournament. After the tournament, the whole team was honoured by the Prime Minister Mark Rutte and Minister of Sport Edith Schippers and made Knights of the Order of Orange-Nassau.

Honours
FC Utrecht
KNVB Women's Cup: 2009–10

FC Twente
BeNe League: 2012–13, 2013–14
Eredivisie: 2010–11
KNVB Women's Cup: 2014–15

Arsenal
FA Women's Super League: 2018–19
FA Women's Cup: 2015–16
FA WSL Cup: 2015, 2017–18
Netherlands
UEFA European Women's Championship: 2017
Algarve Cup: 2018
FIFA Women's World Cup: runner-up 2019
 Tournoi de France: runner-up 2020
Individual
 UEFA European Women's Championship Team of the Tournament: 2017
FIFA Women's World Cup Golden Glove: 2019
The Best FIFA Women's Goalkeeper: 2019
IFFHS World's Best Woman Goalkeeper: 2019
IFFHS Women's World Team: 2019

References

External links

 Official Twitter
 Profile at onsoranje.nl 
 Profile at vrouwenvoetbalnederland.nl 
 
 
 
 Profile at fussballtransfers.com 
 Profile at soccerdonna.de 

1990 births
Living people
People from Nieuwegein
Footballers from Utrecht (province)
Dutch women's footballers
Women's association football goalkeepers
FC Utrecht (women) players
FC Twente (women) players
Arsenal W.F.C. players
Atlético Madrid Femenino players
PSV (women) players
Eredivisie (women) players
Women's Super League players
Primera División (women) players
Olympic footballers of the Netherlands
Netherlands women's international footballers
2015 FIFA Women's World Cup players
2019 FIFA Women's World Cup players
Footballers at the 2020 Summer Olympics
UEFA Women's Championship-winning players
Dutch expatriate women's footballers
Dutch expatriate sportspeople in England
Dutch expatriate sportspeople in Spain
Expatriate women's footballers in England
Expatriate women's footballers in Spain
Knights of the Order of Orange-Nassau
UEFA Women's Euro 2022 players